The 1966 Cork Senior Football Championship was the 78th staging of the Cork Senior Football Championship since its establishment by the Cork County Board in 1887. The draw for the opening round fixtures took place on 30 January 1966. The championship began on 10 April 1966 and ended on 4 December 1966.

St. Nicholas' entered the championship as the defending champions.

On 4 December 1966, St. Nicholas' won the championship following a 1-07 to 1-06 defeat of St. Finbarr's in the final. This was their fifth championship title overall and their second title in succession.

Team changes

To Championship

Promoted from the Cork Intermediate Football Championship
 Mitchelstown

From Championship

Declined to field a team
 Garda

Results

First round

Quarter-finals

Semi-finals

Final

References

Cork Senior Football Championship